Night Child is an album by Canadian pianist Oscar Peterson, accompanied by Joe Pass, Niels-Henning Ørsted Pedersen and Louie Bellson. It is notable in that all compositions are by Peterson and he plays the majority of the songs on electric piano. The album cover depicts his son Joel Peterson, to whom the album is dedicated.

Track listing
 "Solar Winds" – 6:50
 "Dancin' Feet" – 6:20
 "Soliloquy (Blues for Dr. John)" – 9:13
 "Night Child" – 11:35
 "Charlie" – 3:09
 "Teenager" – 5:47

All music written by Oscar Peterson.

Personnel

Performance
 Oscar Peterson – piano (acoustic and electric)
 Joe Pass – guitar
 Niels-Henning Ørsted Pedersen – double bass
 Louie Bellson – drum kit

Production notes
Norman Granz – producer
Phil Sheridan – engineer

Chart positions

References

External links
Joe Pass Memorial Hall

1979 albums
Oscar Peterson albums
Joe Pass albums
Albums produced by Norman Granz
Pablo Records albums